Jameel & Ors v Wall Street Journal Europe Sprl was a House of Lords judgment on English defamation law. The issue was whether the defamatory article was protected by Reynolds privilege. The judgment was an affirmation of Reynolds v Times Newspapers Ltd and effectively upholds a public interest defence in libel cases.

References

External links 
Jameel and others v. Wall Street Journal Europe Sprl [2006] UKHL 44
Jameel & Anor v Wall Street Journal Europe Sprl (No.2) [2005] EWCA Civ 74 (3 February 2005)

English defamation case law
English tort case law
House of Lords cases
The Wall Street Journal
2006 in British case law